Thom Lennart Eklund (born October 28, 1958) is an ice hockey player who played for the Swedish national team. He won a bronze medal at the 1984 and 1988 Winter Olympics. He played for the clubs Södertälje SK, IF Björklöven, VIK Västerås HK and in Italy. He won the World Championship for Sweden in 1987 and a silver for Sweden at the World Championships in 1986 and he also won a Swedish title with Södertälje in 1985.

Career statistics

Regular season and playoffs

International

References 

1958 births
Living people
Ice hockey players at the 1984 Winter Olympics
Ice hockey players at the 1988 Winter Olympics
Olympic ice hockey players of Sweden
Olympic bronze medalists for Sweden
Olympic medalists in ice hockey
Medalists at the 1984 Winter Olympics
IF Björklöven players
Södertälje SK players
VIK Västerås HK players
Medalists at the 1988 Winter Olympics